The Anderson House in Lewistown, Montana is a two-story cut stone house built in 1914.  It was listed on the National Register of Historic Places in 1993.

The house is the last-built of 17 stone houses in Lewistown and the only one built after a cement plant was established.  Its own construction costs were lowered by use of poured concrete in its foundation.  The main walls of the house are cut sandstone.  It has a wood frame full-width enclosed porch.  Subsequent to a fire, and in the two years prior to NRHP listing, the original hipped roof of the house was replaced by a tall gable roof with projecting dormers.

References

Houses on the National Register of Historic Places in Montana
Houses completed in 1914
Stone houses in the United States
1914 establishments in Montana
Sandstone buildings in the United States